Motor Boat & Yachting magazine is a monthly magazine about motorboats and yachting published by Future PLC. The editor-in-chief is Hugo Andreae.

Early history
The magazine was established in July 1904.

References

External links
 

Sports magazines published in the United Kingdom
Boating magazines
English-language magazines
Monthly magazines published in the United Kingdom
Magazines established in 1904